The Primetime Emmy Award for Outstanding Sound Mixing for a Comedy or Drama Series (Half-Hour) and Animation is an award handed out annually at the Creative Arts Emmy Awards.

In the following list, the first titles listed in gold are the winners; those not in gold are nominees, which are listed in alphabetical order. The years given are those in which the ceremonies took place:



Winners and nominations

1980s
Outstanding Tape Sound Mixing for a Series

Outstanding Live and Tape Sound Mixing and Sound Effects for a Series

Outstanding Sound Mixing for a Comedy Series or a Special

1990s

2000s

From 2001 to 2006, categories were divided with single-camera sitcoms competing for Outstanding Single-Camera Sound Mixing for a Series.

Outstanding Multi-Camera Sound Mixing for a Series or a Special

Outstanding Sound Mixing for a Comedy or Drama Series (Half-Hour) and Animation

2010s

2020s

Programs with multiple awards

4 awards
 Cheers

3 awards
 Doogie Howser, M.D.
 Entourage
 Frasier
 Modern Family

2 awards
 Barry
 Mad About You
 The Mandalorian 
 Mozart in the Jungle
 Nurse Jackie

Mixers with multiple awards

8 awards
 Dean Okrand

7 awards
 Thomas J. Huth

6 awards
 Robert Douglass

4 awards
 Michael Ballin
 Doug Gray

3 awards
 Michael Getlin
 Brian Harman
 Peter R. Kelsey
 Joe Kenworthy
 Dennis Kirk
 Paul K. Lewis
 Dana Mark McClure
 Tom Stasinis
 R. William A. Thiederman 
 Stephen A. Tibbo
 Nello Torri

2 awards
 Sam Black
 John Bickelhaupt
 Andre Caporaso
 Andy D'Addario
 Peter Damski
 Chris Fogel 
 Stu Fox
 Mark Hanes
 Rick Himot
 Shawn Holden 
 Martin D. Humphrey
 Bill Jackson
 Jan McLaughlin
 Kathy Oldham
 Benjamin Patrick 
 Elmo Ponsdomenech
 Craig Porter
 Gary D. Rogers
 Ed Suski
 Peter Waggoner 
 Brentley Walton
 Bonnie Wild

Programs with multiple nominations

11 nominations
 Frasier
 Modern Family

9 nominations
 Cheers
 The Simpsons

6 nominations
 Home Improvement
 The Office
 30 Rock

5 nominations
 Entourage
 Everybody Loves Raymond
 Friends
 The Golden Girls
 Veep
 The Wonder Years

4 nominations
 The Cosby Show
 Parks and Recreation
 Silicon Valley
 3rd Rock from the Sun
 Two and a Half Men
 Will & Grace

3 nominations
 Ally McBeal
 Barry
 Doogie Howser, M.D.
 Fame
 Mad About You
 Mozart in the Jungle
 Nurse Jackie
 Seinfeld

2 nominations
 Benson
 Brooklyn Bridge
 Californication
 Family Guy
 Hacks
 The Kominsky Method
 The Larry Sanders Show
 The Mandalorian 
 Murphy Brown
 Scrubs
 Ted Lasso
 That '70s Show
 Weeds

Notes

References

Sound Mixing for a Comedy or Drama Series (Half-Hour) and Animation